Dhirendra Kumar is an Indian Forest Service Officer of 1983 batch. Born on 22 December 1954, he was a former Special Secretary, Industry Department cum Director of Sericulture, Handloom and Handicraft, Government of Jharkhand and Managing Director of Jharkhand Silk Textile and Handicraft Development Corporation (Jharcraft)  Before Joining to the forest services, he did his Post Graduation in Geology from Ranchi University and then served as lecturer at St. Xavier’s College, Ranchi.

Career
After Joining Indian Forest Service in 1983, he held many key positions in the Forest Department. In 2006, he was deputed to Industry Department, Govt. of Jharkhand as Special Secretary cum Director of Sericulture, Handloom and Handicraft. Then few months later, he was appointed as Managing Director of Jharkhand Silk, Textile and Handicraft development corporation Ltd (Jharcraft). He took charge when the activity of Sericulture, Handloom and Handicraft was dying in the state and the annual production of the sericulture in 2006-07 was only 90 metric ton. With his strong Endeavour and hard work, within a 5-year time frame the production of Tassar silk rose to 1025 metric ton, which was more than 10 times and thus Jharkhand has become the leading producer of Tassar Silk in the country and also got the Organic Certification in Tassar Silk. As the silk is cultivated in Arjun and Asan trees in the forest areas, his initiative has also become a major factor in forest conservation.

He not only revived the handloom societies and formed many SHG but Under his leadership, Jharcraft also has given the livelihood Training to more than 3.47 lac people which includes the training of the Sericulture, Handloom and Handicraft. He is also credited to revive the oldest form of casting by lost wax process,i.e. Dhokra Art and started the production centers of Leather accessories, Cane furniture, canvas Shoe, Painting and Apparel Units at jharkhand. He is an officer who does not take any police security while visiting the naxal affected area of Jharkhand. His effort has not only made an economical effect to the life of people but also changed their social life. and with his vision, he had made ray of hope for development in the naxal areas of Jharkhand and given livelihood support nearly all Naxal affected areas of Jharkhand.

For his achievement in the sector he was awarded Udyaog Ratna Award for the year 2014 from Institute of Economic Studies, New Delhi. and in same year he was awarded Rastriya Ratna Award and Bharat Excellence award by Friendship Forum at New Delhi.

References

1954 births
Living people
People from Ranchi